The lesser Asiatic yellow bat (Scotophilus kuhlii) is a species of vesper bat. It is found in Bangladesh, Cambodia, India, Indonesia, Malaysia, Pakistan, the Philippines, Sri Lanka, and Taiwan.

Description

It is a uniform beige color above sometimes with a yellow tinge and its underparts very light brown to whitish. Its wing membrane is dark brown and its ears are pinkish brown. The fur of this speciesvery dense and short.

References

Scotophilus
Bats of Asia
Bats of Southeast Asia
Bats of Indonesia
Bats of Malaysia
Mammals of Bangladesh
Mammals of Myanmar
Mammals of Cambodia
Mammals of Timor
Mammals of Hong Kong
Mammals of India
Mammals of the Philippines
Mammals of Pakistan
Mammals of Sri Lanka
Mammals of Thailand
Mammals of Taiwan
Mammals of Vietnam
Least concern biota of Asia
Mammals described in 1821
Taxonomy articles created by Polbot

Bats of India